Thirst is a 1949 Swedish drama film directed by Ingmar Bergman. It was released as Three Strange Loves in the United Kingdom.

Plot
Rut and her husband Bertil travel home by train after a holiday in Italy. Their marriage is unhappy due to Rut's changing moods and heavy drinking. While passing through the ruins of post-war Germany, Rut recalls an earlier affair with married military officer Raoul. Raoul forced her to abort their child, which resulted in complications, Rut's infertility and inability to continue her career as a dancer. Her friend and co-dancer Valborg, disgusted by men, turned to other women.

Bertil is still haunted by an earlier affair with widow Viola. While Rut and Bertil travel home, the film shows Viola's escape from a sadistic psychiatrist, her encounter with Valborg, who openly tries to seduce her, and her final suicide.

Meanwhile, the tensions between Rut and Bertil escalate, and Bertil seemingly kills Rut after a fight. Bertil awakens and realises that he imagined Rut's death. The couple decide to give their marriage another chance.

Cast
 Eva Henning as Rut
 Birger Malmsten as Bertil
 Birgit Tengroth as Viola
 Hasse Ekman as Dr. Rosengren
 Mimi Nelson as Valborg
 Bengt Eklund as Raoul
 Gaby Stenberg as Astrid
 Naima Wifstrand as Miss Henriksson
 Verner Arpe as German ticket collector
 Calle Flygare as Priest
 Sven-Eric Gamble as Glass worker
 Helge Hagerman as Priest
 Else-Merete Heiberg as Norwegian lady
 Estrid Hesse as Patient
 Gunnar Nielsen as Assistant doctor
 Sif Ruud as Widow

Production
After the financial failure of Prison, the collaboration between Terrafilm and Bergman had ended. Svensk Filmindustri offered Bergman to produce his next film. Thirst was based on a short story collection published by Birgit Tengroth in 1948; Herbert Grevenius, who had already worked with Bergman on It Rains on Our Love, wrote the screenplay. Bergman asked Tengroth to star in his film, who helped him in finding the right tone in the lesbian scene between Viola and Valborg. Shooting took place between 15 March and 5 July 1949. Thirst premiered on 17 October 1949 in Sweden and on 30 August 1956 in the US.

Swedish Critic Jörn Donner later called Thirst "a commercial version of Prison". François Truffaut saw similarities between Bergman's film and Alfred Hitchcock's Suspicion and Rich and Strange.

Literature
Bergman on Bergman, Touchstone/Simon & Schuster, New York 1973.

References

External links

1949 films
1949 drama films
1940s LGBT-related films
Films directed by Ingmar Bergman
Swedish black-and-white films
1940s Swedish-language films
Swedish LGBT-related films
Adultery in films
Films set on trains
Films about abortion
Films about ballet
Swedish drama films